The LocaliQ Series, stylized as the LOCALiQ Series, was a one-off professional golf tour played in 2020 and organised by the PGA Tour.

The series was announced following the cancellation of much of the PGA Tour's global development tours due to the COVID-19 pandemic. The tour is aimed at players who would have qualified to play on PGA Tour Canada, PGA Tour Latinoamérica and PGA Tour China in 2020, with places also available to players on the second-tier Korn Ferry Tour and sponsor invites. Originally called the XYZ Series, business marketing firm LocaliQ became the title sponsor.

The seven regular tournaments on the circuit were contested over 54 holes of stroke play with 144 competitors, a cut line of 55 plus ties, and a minimum prize fund of $100,000. The series finale was a limited-field event over 72 holes. The winner and the two leaders in the overall series points standings were awarded sponsor exemptions into a tournament on the PGA Tour in 2021. The series was awarded Official World Golf Ranking status, with four points for winners of 54-hole events and six for the 72-hole championship.

Bryson Nimmer finished top of the LocaliQ Series points standings after winning both of the first two tournaments and finishing as runner-up in the fourth; his prize was an invite to initially the RBC Canadian Open, but that was eliminated because of border restrictions;  he was allowed entry into the Palmetto Championship, the one-off replacement event that replaced the RBC Canadian Open. David Pastore won the Series Championship, the circuits final event, to move into second place in the standings and was rewarded with an invite to the 2021 Barbasol Championship. As a result, Carson Young, who finished third in the standings, received the third PGA Tour invite, to the 2021 Puerto Rico Open.

With the final event being originally scheduled in The Bahamas, the Local iQ Series points competition was titled as the "Race to The Bahamas", with a tournament win being worth 500 points. The event ultimately was moved to Duluth, Georgia.

The one-off tour resulted in the development of a United States-based third-tier tour, the Forme Tour, in 2021. Like the LOCALiQ Series, the Forme Tour also lasted one season in response to travel restrictions.

Schedule

The following table lists official events during the 2020 season.

Order of Merit
The Order of Merit was titled as the Race to The Bahamas and was based on prize money won during the season, calculated using a points-based system.

See also
2019–20 PGA Tour
2020–21 Korn Ferry Tour
2020 PGA Tour Latinoamérica
2020 PGA Tour Canada
2020 PGA Tour China

Notes

References

External links

2020 in golf
Professional golf tours
2020 establishments in the United States